"Here to Go" is a song by the American new wave band Devo, written by Mark Mothersbaugh and Gerald Casale. It was released on their sixth studio album, Shout, in 1984 and was released as a single in 1985. "Here to Go" quotes a bit of the music to the Wilson Pickett hit "Land of a Thousand Dances."

In 1991, "Here to Go" was performed live for the first time during the Smooth Noodle Maps tour.

Track listing
Side one
"Here to Go (Go Mix Version)" – 5:32
"Here to Go (Here to Dub Version)" – 5:44

Side two
"Shout (LP Version)" – 3:15
"Shout (E-Z Listening Version)" – 4:15

 Both "Here to Go" remixes were reissued by Infinite Zero in 1995 as bonus tracks on the remastered and expanded Oh, No! It's Devo CD.

Chart performance

References

External links
 

1985 singles
1984 songs
Devo songs
Songs written by Mark Mothersbaugh
Songs written by Gerald Casale
Warner Records singles